García Miguel de Ayerbe (died 4 September 1332) was an Aragonese nobleman and cleric who served as the bishop of León from April 1318 until his death. In the 1320s, he wrote a proposal for a new crusade to recover the Holy Land.

Life
Little is known of García's early life. He was a native of Aragon and his father's name was Miguel, but it is not known with certainty to which of two noble families associated with Ayerbe he belonged. Before coming to León, he was a canon and sacristan of the cathedral of Zaragoza. He later served as camerarius of Tarragona.

In April 1318, García was elected bishop of León, ending a 16-month vacancy. In October, he reopened a century-old dispute by attempting to assert episcopal authority over the abbey of Sahagún, which claimed exemption. In 1322, he appealed to the papal legate Cardinal Guillaume de Pierre Godin for the return of certain lands held by the abbey. The dispute, however, was not resolved until Pope John XXII found in the bishop's favour in 1328. Disputed economic rights in six villages were only finally settled by arbitration before the abbot of San Isidoro in 1330. The two parties then signed an accord that permanently settled the dispute. In 1319, García defaulted on a debt to a merchant despite having sworn an oath and was threatened with excommunication.

In 1320, the cloisters of the cathedral were burnt during a confrontation between factions following the death of the regents Pedro de Castilla and Juan el de Tarifa the previous year. The city of León had supported Juan for the throne in 1296 and García seems to have been close to his son, Juan el Tuerto. There is a suggestion in the Crónica de Alfonso XI that García was considered a suspect foreigner in the royal court. The earliest royal act to mention García is dated 16 September 1322 and confers on the bishop some privileges conferred on the bishops of León by previous monarchs. As King Alfonso XI was a minor, the grant was actually drawn up by Juan el Tuerto in the king's name. While García left the reconstruction of the cloisters to the canons, beginning in 1324 he took a leading role in the construction of a new wall around the precinct that had grown up outside the old Roman .

In October 1326, the diocese of León was assessed for a payment of 55,883 maravedíes. In February 1327, García remitted 33,350 and the account was considered paid. That same month, Alfonso XI ordered him to hand over the castles of Mesmino and Peña Morquera or face charges of treason. He did not attend the king's major cortes in this period. His nephew, Miguel Bertrán de Ayerbe, died on 10 November 1328 while visiting García in León and was buried in the cathedral there.

In 1329, García began a programme of copying documents confirming León's royal exemptions. In at least one case—a privilege of Sancho IV—the original document had been destroyed in the fire of 1320. In August 1332, Alfonso XI confirmed all his predecessors acts in favour of León. A month later, on 4 September, García died, as recorded in the necrologies of both Zaragoza and León.

Works
Between 1323 and 1328, García wrote a "recovery" treatise in Latin proposing a new crusade to recover the Holy Land for Christendom. It is unclear what motivated him to write or, if he was commissioned, by whom. The work was probably intended for King Charles IV of France. It was translated into Old French. Its short title is Informacio. Two manuscript copies exist:

Paris, Bibliothèque nationale de France, MS lat. 7470, folios 123v–129v, a contemporary Latin copy from the reign of Charles IV
Paris, Bibliothèque Sainte-Geneviève, MS 1654, folios 151–162, an Old French copy with numerous scribal errors, probably made for Charles IV

García begins his proposal with a brief account of the history of the crusades. He considers the legendary campaign of Charlemagne in the Holy Land to be the first crusade. He recounts the First Crusade, Second Crusade, Seventh Crusade and the Lord Edward's crusade. He stresses the supposed treachery of the Byzantines. His plan demanded peace between France, Aragon, Castile and Sicily, to be achieved through marriage alliances. He recommended a marriage between Alfonso XI and Joan of Navarre. His Spanish perspective is apparent when he argues for raising 2,000 troops from Spain and Gascony. In the first stage of his proposed expedition, an army of mercenaries in galleys would establish a foothold in the mountains of Syria. If repulsed, they would retreat to Rhodes and Cyprus. Only after this would actual crusaders proceed to the Holy Land as reinforcements. Wood for building could be shipped in from Rhodes and Cyprus.

García envisages crusaders travelling both overland and by sea. One of the values of the overland route was that it would allow the Byzantine empire, which he believed would ally with the Anatolian Turks against the crusaders, to be conquered. He expresses hope that the Ilkhanate would prevent the Turks from coming to their ally's aid. He correctly perceived that the Ilkhanate was a potential ally only because of its greater animosity towards the Mamluks. He is unaware, however, that the Ilkhanids and Mamluks had signed a peace treaty in 1323. Most unrealistically, he estimates that it would take a year for the crusaders and their allies to defeat both the Byzantines and Turks. As for the maritime side, García recommends the fleets to stop frequently to allow men and animals to rest onshore and urges the king to practice swimming. He evidently had little experience of or confidence in sea travel.

Besides the crusade treatise, García wrote an Ecclesiastical Constitution for his diocese in 1319 and a letter dated 18 March 1324.

Notes

References

Bibliography

13th-century births
1332 deaths
14th-century Aragonese nobility
14th-century Aragonese Roman Catholic priests
Bishops of León
Medieval writers about the Crusades